Kuwait competed at the 1984 Summer Olympics in Los Angeles, United States. 23 competitors, all men, took part in 17 events in 5 sports.

Athletics

Diving

Men's 3m Springboard
Abdulla Abuqrais
 Preliminary Round — 312.24 (→ did not advance, 29th place)

Majed Altaqi
 Preliminary Round — 299.16 (→ did not advance, 30th place)

Fencing

Nine fencers, all men, represented Kuwait in 1984.

Men's foil
 Khaled Al-Awadhi
 Ahmed Al-Ahmed
 Kifah Al-Mutawa

Men's team foil
 Ahmed Al-Ahmed, Khaled Al-Awadhi, Kifah Al-Mutawa, Mohamed Ghaloum

Men's épée
 Mohamed Al-Thuwani
 Kazem Hasan
 Osama Al-Khurafi

Men's team épée
 Osama Al-Khurafi, Abdul Nasser Al-Sayegh, Ali Hasan, Kazem Hasan, Mohamed Al-Thuwani

Judo

Swimming

Men's 100m Freestyle 
Khaled Al-Assaf
 Heat — 56.91 (→ did not advance, 59th place)

Men's 100m Breaststroke
Ahmad Al-Hahdoud
 Heat — 1:13.01 (→ did not advance, 47th place)

Isaac Atish Wa-El
 Heat — 1:16.51 (→ did not advance, 49th place)

Men's 200m Breaststroke 
Ahmad Al-Hahdoud
 Heat — 2:37.63 (→ did not advance, 41st place)

Men's 100m Butterfly
Faisal Marzouk
 Heat — 1:02.00 (→ did not advance, 43rd place)

Adel Al-Ghaith
 Heat — 1:04.62 (→ did not advance, 47th place)

References

External links
Official Olympic Reports

Nations at the 1984 Summer Olympics
1984
Summer Olympics